The Lal Bahadur Shastri Stadium, formerly known as Fateh Maidan, is a multi-purpose sports stadium in Hyderabad, Telangana. The stadium is primarily used for cricket and association football.

The stadium was renamed in 1967 in memory of Lal Bahadur Shastri, India's former Prime Minister. As of 19 August 2017, it has hosted 3 Tests and 14 ODIs.

History

During the eight-month siege of Golconda in 1687 the Mughal soldiers were camped on a vast open ground. After their victory, this ground was named as Fateh Maidan (Victory Square). During Asaf Jahi period, Fateh Maidan was used as Polo Grounds. Gymkhana ground in Secunderabad which was the home of Hyderabad Cricket Association did not have stands to accommodate the large number of spectators that used to watch the cricket matches. The matches were therefore held at Fateh Maidan even though the grounds were not owned by Hyderabad Cricket Association but by Andhra Pradesh Sports Council. The first test match was hosted in November 1955 against New Zealand. The stadium was renamed as Lal Bahadur Shastri Stadium in 1967. Floodlights were introduced in 1993 during the Hero Cup match between the West Indies and Zimbabwe. The Stadium was the home ground for the Hyderabad cricket team.

In 2005, the use of Lal Bahadur Shastri Stadium for International cricket was discontinued when Rajiv Gandhi International Cricket Stadium built across town hosted an ODI Match between India and South Africa. The stadium is now hosting Indian Cricket League matches and is the home ground for the 2008 Edelweiss 20's Challenge winners Hyderabad Heroes.

Lal Bahadur Stadium is situated behind the police control room, between the Nizam College and Public Gardens in Hyderabad. It is the venue for many national and international sporting events, especially for football and cricket. The stadium was previously known as Fateh Maidan.

It has the capacity to seat around 25,000 people. The swimming pool, shopping complex and the indoor stadium are the important aspects of this stadium. The ground has flood light facility and now is used as the Sports Authority of Telangana State (SATS).The games played here are mainly Cricket and Football.

Lal Bahadur Shastri Stadium has hosted only three Test matches – all against New Zealand. Polly Umrigar's double century and Subhash Gupte's 7 wickets in NZ's first innings were the most notable performances of the inaugural Test between these two teams and ended in a draw. In 1988/89, local players Arshad Ayub with seven wickets in the match and Mohammad Azharuddin, who top scored with 81 runs led India to a 10 wicket victory and a 2–1 Series victory.

ODI Cricket

The first ODI Match was played in the stadium during the 1983/84 season when India hosted Pakistan and won the match by four wickets. The match between India and Pakistan on 20 March 1987 was a thriller which ended with the scores tied at 212 in 44 overs. India were declared the victors because they lost fewer wickets (six to Pakistan's seven).

In one of the great matches played during the 1987 Cricket World Cup, David Houghton's 142 fell just short of lifting Zimbabwe to an epic victory. Apart from Houghton and Iain Butchart's 54, all other Zimbabwean batsmen scored single figures as New Zealand won by 3 runs. The Hero Cup encounter (1992) between West Indies and Zimbabwe saw the first day/night match in the stadium. The match was easily won by West Indies. In all, the stadium has hosted seven-day/night matches. In the 1996 Cricket World Cup, the West Indies overhauled Zimbabwe's 151 in just 29.3 overs on their way to a semi-final appearance in the tournament.

In the 1999/00 season, the stadium hosted the 2nd match in the 5-match ODI Series between India and New Zealand. Having suffered a defeat in Rajkot, India lost Sourav Ganguly in the second over (run-out) as a straight drive from Sachin richoched off Shayne O'Connor's fingers into the non-striker's stumps. Rahul Dravid and Tendulkar then put on a world-record 331 run partnership off 46.2 overs as India amassed on 376 runs and easily won the match by 174 runs.

In the final match played at Lal Bahadur Shastri Stadium (2003), India played against New Zealand in the TVS Cup encounter that decided the second finalist (Australia already booked its spot). Tendulkar's century and Virender Sehwag's 130 created a platform for Dravid to equal the second fastest fifty by an Indian – 50 off 22 balls as India scored 353 runs and won the match comfortably by 145 runs.

Venue statistics

Match Information

Test Match statistics

The highest scores were made by West Indies, scoring 498–4 in 1959 and 358 all out in 1948. The next highest score was made by New Zealand scoring 326 all out in Test cricket. The most runs scored here was by Polly Umrigar (223 runs), followed by Bert Sutcliffe (154 runs) and John Guy (123 runs). The most wickets taken here was by Erapalli Prasana (8 wickets) by Subhash Gupte (8 wickets)and Dayle Hadlee (7 wickets).

ODI Match statistics

The highest scores were made by India, scoring 376–2 in ODIs. The next highest scores were also made by India who scored 353-5 and South Africa who scored 261–7.

The most runs scored here was by Sachin Tendulkar (310 runs), followed by Rahul Dravid (297 runs) and Dave Houghton (164 runs). Anil Kumble (7 wickets), Ajit Agarkar (6 wickets) and Manoj Prabharkar (5 wickets) are the leading wicket-takers on this ground in ODIs.

List of Centuries

Key
 * denotes that the batsman was not out.
 Inns. denotes the number of the innings in the match.
 Balls denotes the number of balls faced in an innings.
 NR denotes that the number of balls was not recorded.
 Parentheses next to the player's score denotes his century number at Edgbaston.
 The column title Date refers to the date the match started.
 The column title Result refers to the player's team result

Test Centuries

One Day Internationals

List of Five Wicket Hauls

Key

Tests

One DAY Internationals

See also

List of Test cricket grounds
Rajiv Gandhi International Cricket Stadium

References

External links
 Cricinfo Website - Ground Page
 Lal Bahadur Shastri Stadium
 cricketarchive Website - Ground Page

Sports venues in Hyderabad, India
Test cricket grounds in India
Cricket in Hyderabad, India
Sports venues in Telangana
Football venues in Telangana
Cricket grounds in Telangana
Memorials to Lal Bahadur Shastri
Indian Cricket League stadiums
1987 Cricket World Cup stadiums
1996 Cricket World Cup stadiums
1950 establishments in India
Sports venues completed in 1950
20th-century architecture in India